Mars Pathfinder (MESUR Pathfinder) is an American robotic spacecraft that landed a base station with a roving probe on Mars in 1997. It consisted of a lander, renamed the Carl Sagan Memorial Station, and a lightweight,  wheeled robotic Mars rover named Sojourner, the first rover to operate outside the Earth–Moon system.

Launched on December 4, 1996, by NASA aboard a Delta II booster a month after the Mars Global Surveyor, it landed on July 4, 1997, on Mars's Ares Vallis, in a region called Chryse Planitia in the Oxia Palus quadrangle. The lander then opened, exposing the rover which conducted many experiments on the Martian surface. The mission carried a series of scientific instruments to analyze the Martian atmosphere, climate, and geology and the composition of its rocks and soil. It was the second project from NASA's Discovery Program, which promotes the use of low-cost spacecraft and frequent launches under the motto "cheaper, faster and better" promoted by then-administrator Daniel Goldin. The mission was directed by the Jet Propulsion Laboratory (JPL), a division of the California Institute of Technology, responsible for NASA's Mars Exploration Program. The project manager was JPL's Tony Spear.

This mission was the first of a series of missions to Mars that included rovers, and was the first successful lander since the two Vikings landed on Mars in 1976. Although the Soviet Union successfully sent rovers to the Moon as part of the Lunokhod program in the 1970s, its attempts to use rovers in its Mars program failed.

In addition to scientific objectives, the Mars Pathfinder mission was also a "proof-of-concept" for various technologies, such as airbag-mediated touchdown and automated obstacle avoidance, both later exploited by the Mars Exploration Rover mission. The Mars Pathfinder was also remarkable for its extremely low cost relative to other robotic space missions to Mars. Originally, the mission was conceived as the first of the Mars Environmental Survey (MESUR) program.

Mission objectives
 To prove that the development of "faster, better and cheaper" spacecraft was possible (with three years for development and a cost under $150 million for the lander, and $25 million for the rover).
 To show that it was possible to send a load of scientific instruments to another planet with a simple system and at one-fifteenth the cost of a Viking mission. (For comparison, the Viking missions cost $935 million in 1974 or $3.5 billion in 1997 dollars.)
 To demonstrate NASA's commitment to low-cost planetary exploration by finishing the mission with a total expenditure of $280 million, including the launch vehicle and mission operations.

Science experiments

The Mars Pathfinder conducted different investigations on the Martian soil using three scientific instruments. The lander contained a stereoscopic camera with spatial filters on an expandable pole called Imager for Mars Pathfinder (IMP), and the Atmospheric Structure Instrument/Meteorology Package (ASI/MET) which acts as a Mars meteorological station, collecting data about pressure, temperature, and winds.

The Sojourner rover had an Alpha Proton X-ray Spectrometer (APXS), which was used to analyze the components of the rocks and soil. The rover also had two black-and-white cameras and a color one. These instruments could investigate the geology of the Martian surface from just a few millimeters to many hundreds of meters, the geochemistry and evolutionary history of the rocks and surface, the magnetic and mechanical properties of the land, as well as the magnetic properties of the dust, atmosphere and the rotational and orbital dynamics of the planet.

Three navigation cameras were on board the rover: Two black and white 0.3-megapixel cameras were located on the front (768 horizontal pixels × 484 vertical pixels configured in 4×4+100 pixel blocks), coupled with five laser stripe projectors, which enabled stereoscopic images to be taken along with measurements for hazard detection on the rover's path. A third camera with the same resolution but taking color images was located on the back, near the APXS, and rotated by 90°. It provided images of the APXS's target area and the rover's tracks on the ground. The pixels of this color camera were arranged in such a way, that out of the 16 pixel of a 4×4 pixel block, 12 pixel were sensitive to green, 2 pixel to red and 2 pixel were sensitive to infrared as well as blue. As all cameras had lenses made out of zinc selenide, which blocks light below a wavelength of 500 nm, no blue light actually reached these "blue/infrared" pixels, which therefore recorded only infrared.

All three cameras were CCDs manufactured by Eastman Kodak Company, and were controlled by the rover's CPU. They all had auto-exposure and capabilities for handling bad pixels, and the image parameters (exposure time, compression used, etc.) were included in the transmitted images as part of the image header. The rover could compress the front cameras' images using the block truncation coding (BTC) algorithm, but it could only do the same for the back camera's images if the color information was discarded. The cameras' optical resolution was sufficient to resolve  details across a  range.

Pathfinder lander
 Imager for Mars Pathfinder (IMP), (includes magnetometer and anemometer)
 Atmospheric and meteorological sensors (ASI/MET)

Sojourner rover

 Imaging system (three cameras: front B&W stereo, 1 rear color)
 Laser striper hazard detection system
 Alpha Proton X-ray Spectrometer (APXS)
 Wheel Abrasion Experiment
 Materials Adherence Experiment
 Accelerometers

Landing site
The landing site was an ancient flood plain in Mars's northern hemisphere called "Ares Vallis" ("the valley of Ares", the ancient Greek equivalent of the ancient Roman deity Mars) and is among the rockiest parts of Mars. Scientists chose it because they found it to be a relatively safe surface to land on and one that contained a wide variety of rocks deposited during a catastrophic flood. (See also List of extraterrestrial memorials)

Entry, descent and landing

Mars Pathfinder entered the Martian atmosphere and landed using an innovative system involving an entry capsule, a supersonic parachute, followed by solid rockets and large airbags to cushion the impact.

Mars Pathfinder directly entered Mars atmosphere in a retrograde direction from a hyperbolic trajectory at  using an atmospheric entry aeroshell (capsule) that was derived from the original Viking Mars lander design. The lander's on-board computer used redundant on-board accelerometers to determine the timing of the parachute inflation. Twenty seconds later the heatshield was pyrotechnically released. Another twenty seconds later the lander was separated and lowered from the backshell on a  bridle. This information was used by the computer to determine the precise timing of the landing events that followed.

The airbags were made of four inter-connected multi-layer vectran bags that surrounded the tetrahedron lander. However, as the airbags were designed for no more than about  vertical impacts, three solid retrorockets were mounted above the lander in the backshell. The rockets flew up and away with the backshell and parachute (they have since been sighted by orbital images).

The entire entry, descent and landing process was completed in four minutes.

Once the lander stopped rolling, the airbags deflated and retracted toward the lander using four winches mounted on the lander "petals". Designed to right itself from any initial orientation, the lander happened to roll right side up onto its base petal. 87 minutes after landing, the petals were deployed with Sojourner rover and the solar panels attached on the inside.

The lander arrived at night at 2:56:55 Mars local solar time (16:56:55 UTC) on July 4, 1997. The lander had to wait until sunrise to send its first digital signals and images to Earth. During Sol 1, the first Martian solar day the lander spent on the planet, the lander took pictures and made some meteorologic measurements. Once the data was received, the engineers realized that one of the airbags hadn't fully deflated and could be a problem for the forthcoming traverse of Sojourners descent ramp. To solve the problem, they sent commands to the lander to raise one of its petals and perform additional retraction to flatten the airbag. The procedure was a success and on Sol 2, Sojourner was released, stood up and backed down one of two ramps.

Rover operations

Sojourner deployment
The Sojourner rover exit from the lander occurred on Sol 2, after its landing on July 4, 1997. As the next sols progressed it approached some rocks, which the scientists named "Barnacle Bill", "Yogi", and "Scooby-Doo", after famous cartoon characters. The rover made measurements of the elements found in those rocks and in the martian soil, while the lander took pictures of the Sojourner and the surrounding terrain, in addition to making climate observations.

Its maximum speed reached . During its 83 sols of operation, it sent 550 photographs to Earth and analyzed the chemical properties of 16 locations near the lander. (See also Space exploration rovers)

Sojourners rock analysis

The first analysis on a rock started on Sol 3 with Barnacle Bill. The Alpha Particle X-ray Spectrometer (APXS) was used to determine its composition, the spectrometer taking ten hours to make a full scan of the sample. It found all the elements except hydrogen, which constitutes just 0.1 percent of the rock's or soil's mass.

The APXS works by irradiating rocks and soil samples with alpha particles (helium nuclei, which consist of two protons and two neutrons). The results indicated that "Barnacle Bill" is much like Earth's andesites, confirming past volcanic activity.  The discovery of andesites shows that some Martian rocks have been remelted and reprocessed.  On Earth, andesite forms when magma sits in pockets of rock while some of the iron and magnesium settle out.  Consequently, the final rock contains less iron and magnesiums and more silica.  Volcanic rocks are usually classified by comparing the relative amount of alkalis (Na2O and K2O) with the amount of silica (SiO2).  Andesite is different from the rocks found in meteorites that have come from Mars.

Analysis of the Yogi rock again using the APXS showed that it was a basaltic rock, more primitive than Barnacle Bill. Yogi's shape and texture show that it was probably deposited there by a flood.

Another rock, named Moe, was found to have certain marks on its surface, demonstrating erosion caused by the wind. Most rocks analyzed showed a high content of silicon. In another region known as Rock Garden, Sojourner encountered crescent moon-shaped dunes, which are similar to crescentic dunes on Earth.

By the time that final results of the mission were described in a series of articles in the journal Science (December 5, 1997), it was believed that the rock Yogi contained a coating of dust, but was similar to the rock Barnacle Bill.  Calculations suggest that the two rocks contain mostly the minerals orthopyroxene (magnesium-iron silicate), feldspars (aluminum silicates of potassium, sodium, and calcium), and quartz (silicon dioxide), with smaller amounts of magnetite, ilmenite, iron sulfide, and calcium phosphate.

On-board computer

The embedded computer on board the Sojourner rover was based around the 2 MHz Intel 80C85 CPU with 512 KB of RAM and 176 KB of flash memory solid-state storage, running a cyclic executive.

The computer of the Pathfinder lander was a Radiation Hardened IBM Risc 6000 Single Chip (Rad6000 SC) CPU with 128 MB of RAM and 6 MB of EEPROM and its operating system was VxWorks.

The mission was jeopardised by a concurrent software bug in the lander, which had been found in preflight testing but was deemed a glitch and therefore given a low priority as it only occurred in certain unanticipated heavy-load conditions, and the focus was on verifying the entry and landing code. The problem, which was reproduced and corrected from Earth using a laboratory duplicate thanks to the logging and debugging functionality enabled in the flight software, was due to computer resets caused by priority inversion. No scientific or engineering data was lost after a computer reset, but all the following operations were interrupted until the next day. Four resets occurred (on July 5, 10, 11 and 14) during the mission, before patching the software on July 21 to enable priority inheritance.

Results from Pathfinder

The lander sent more than 2.3 billion bits (287.5 megabytes) of information including 16,500 pictures and made 8.5 million measurements of the atmospheric pressure, temperature and wind speed.

By taking multiple images of the sky at different distances from the Sun, scientists were able to determine that the size of the particles in the pink haze was about one micrometre in radius.  The color of some soils was similar to that of an iron oxyhydroxide phase which would support the theory of a warmer and wetter climate in the past. Pathfinder carried a series of magnets to examine the magnetic component of the dust. Eventually, all but one of the magnets developed a coating of dust.  Since the weakest magnet did not attract any soil, it was concluded that the airborne dust did not contain pure magnetite or just one type of maghemite. The dust probably was an aggregate possibly cemented with ferric oxide (Fe2O3). Using much more sophisticated instruments, Mars Spirit rover found that magnetite could explain the magnetic nature of the dust and soil on Mars.  Magnetite was found in the soil and that the most magnetic part of the soil was dark.  Magnetite is very dark.

Using Doppler tracking and two-way ranging, scientists added earlier measurements from the Viking landers to determine that the non-hydrostatic component of the polar moment of inertia is due to the Tharsis bulge and that the interior is not melted.

End of mission

Although the mission was planned to last from a week to a month, the rover operated successfully for almost three months. Communication failed after October 7, with a final data transmission received from Pathfinder at 10:23 UTC on September 27, 1997. Mission managers tried to restore full communications during the following five months, but the mission was terminated on March 10, 1998. During the extended operation a high-resolution stereo panorama of the surrounding terrain was being made, and the Sojourner rover was to visit a distant ridge, but the panorama was only about one-third completed and the ridge visit had not begun when communication failed.

The on-board battery—designed to operate for one month—may have failed after repeated charging and discharging. The battery was used to heat the probe's electronics to slightly above the expected nighttime temperatures on Mars. With the failure of the battery, colder-than-normal temperatures may have caused vital parts to break, leading to loss of communications.  The mission had exceeded its goals in the first month.

Mars Reconnaissance Orbiter spotted the Pathfinder lander in January 2007 (left).

Naming the rover

The name Sojourner was chosen for the Mars Pathfinder rover when 12-year old Valerie Ambroise, of Bridgeport, Connecticut, won a year-long, worldwide competition in which students up to 18 years old were invited to select a heroine and submit an essay about her historical accomplishments. The students were asked to address in their essays how a planetary rover named for their heroine would translate these accomplishments to the Martian environment.

Initiated in March 1994 by The Planetary Society of Pasadena, California, in cooperation with NASA's Jet Propulsion Laboratory (JPL), the contest got under way with an announcement in the January 1995 issue of the National Science Teachers Association's magazine Science and Children, circulated to 20,000 teachers and schools across the nation.

Ambroise's winning essay, which suggested naming the rover for the 19th century women's rights activist Sojourner Truth, was selected from among 3,500 essays. First runner-up was Deepti Rohatgi, 18, of Rockville, Maryland, who suggested scientist Marie Curie. Second runner-up was Adam Sheedy, 15, of Round Rock, Texas, who submitted the name of the late astronaut Judith Resnik, who perished in the 1986 Space Shuttle Challenger explosion. Other popular suggestions included explorer and guide Sacajewea and aviator Amelia Earhart.

Honors
 In 1997, the Sojourner Team was awarded a JPL Award for Technical Excellence
 On October 21, 1997, at the Geological Society of America's annual meeting in Salt Lake City, Utah, Sojourner was awarded honorary membership in the Planetary Geology Division of the society
 In 2003, Sojourner was inducted into the Robot Hall of Fame

In popular culture 
 The opening title sequence of the television series Star Trek: Enterprise features footage of Sojourner on the Martian surface, intermixed with various other images representative of humankind's evolution of air and space flight.
 In the 2000 film Red Planet, astronauts stranded on Mars make a makeshift radio from parts of Pathfinder, and use it to communicate with their spaceship.
 In the 2011 novel The Martian by Andy Weir, and its 2015 film adaptation, the protagonist, Mark Watney, who is stranded alone on Mars, travels to the long-dead Pathfinder site (noting the "Twin Peaks" as a landmark in the novel), and returns it to his base in an attempt to communicate with Earth.

Sojourner location in context

See also

 
 
 List of missions to Mars
 
 
 
 Comparison of embedded computer systems on board the Mars rovers

Notes

References

 JPL Mars Pathfinder article
 Mars Pathfinder Litograph Set, NASA. (1997)
 Poster: Mars Pathfinder –Roving the Red Planet, NASA. (1998)
 Deep Space Chronicle: A Chronology of Deep Space and Planetary Probes 1958–2000, Asif A. Siddiqi. Monographs in Aerospace History, #24. June 2002, NASA History Office.
 "Return to Mars", article by William R. Newcott. National Geographic, pp. 2–29. Vol. 194, 2nd edition – August 1998.
 "La misión Pathfinder –rebautizada Carl Sagan Memorial Station, en memoria del célebre astrónomo-, paso a paso todo Marte", de J. Roberto Mallo. Conozca Más, págs. 90–96. Edición número 106 – agosto de 1997.
 "Un espía que anda por Marte", de Julio Guerrieri. Descubrir, págs. 80–83. Edición número 73 – agosto de 1997.
 "Mars Pathfinder: el inicio de la conquista de Marte" EL Universo, Enciclopedia de la Astronomía y el Espacio, Editorial Planeta-De Agostini, págs. 58–60. Tomo 5. (1997)
 Sojourner: An Insider's View of the Mars Pathfinder Mission, by Andrew Mishkin, Senior Systems Engineer, NASA Jet Propulsion Laboratory. 
 Experiences with operations and autonomy of the Mars Pathfinder microrover, A. H. Mishkin, J. C. Morrison, T. T. Nguyen, H. W. Stone, B. K. Cooper and B. H. Wilcox. In Proceedings of the IEEE Aerospace Conference, Snowmass, CO 1998.

External links

 Mars Pathfinder NASA/JPL Website

 
1997 in science
1997 robots
Derelict landers (spacecraft)
Discovery Program
Mars rovers
Missions to Mars
NASA space probes
Oxia Palus quadrangle
Robots of the United States
Six-wheeled robots
Spacecraft launched by Delta II rockets
Spacecraft launched in 1996
Soft landings on Mars
1997 on Mars